Merchants Exchange Building  can refer to:

 55 Wall Street, New York, formerly the Merchants' Exchange Building
 Merchants' Exchange Building (Philadelphia)
 Merchants Exchange Building (San Francisco)
 Merchants Exchange Building (St. Louis)
 Merchants Exchange (Boston)

See also
 Royal Exchange (New York), later known as Merchants Exchange